Maibang (IPA: mai-bang [mai means rice and bang means much], defining a land of prosperity) is a town and a town area committee in Dima Hasao district in the Indian state of Assam. Maibang is also one of the three sub-divisions of Dima Hasao District. It was once the capital of the Dimasa Kachari Kingdom. There is a stone house of Dimasa king.

History
Maibang was the capital of the erstwhile Dimasa kingdom, from the 16th to 18th century. The ruins of the kingdom can still be found on the eastern bank of Mahur, south of Maibang and other parts of Dima Hasao district. Among them the most popular is "Stone House" (In Dimasa it is called "Longthai ni Noh") situated on the bank of Mahur River on south Maibang.

Administration

Geography
Maibang town is situated in a hilly area at the bank of Mahur River. It has an average elevation of 355 metres (1164 feet).

The town area is about 10 square kilometres.

Economy

Tourism

Tourist attractions in Maibang include:
 Rajbari: ruins of city of the Kachari Kingdom, on the south side of Maibang.
Stone house: a monolithic ancient Indian temple from the 12th century with two roofs.
 Maibang Waterfalls: Maibang has several water falls around the city.

Demographics

 the majority religion was Hinduism.

Languages

Bengali is the most spoken language at 3,134 speakers, followed by Dimasa at 1,719, Hindi is spoken by 558 people and Assamese at 246.
Dimasa is the dialect of the majority Dimasa tribe of the district. The dialect is yet to be recognized as a language. "Hill Hindi" or "Haflong Hindi" is used as the lingua franca. Most people speak Dimasa. The languages of instruction in the schools and colleges are Assamese, Bengali and English up to HSLC level in the schools of the town.

Education
Maibang Degree College (established in 1988) is the only college in the civil sub-division of Dima Hasao district. The college offers both pass and honours course in the Arts and Science stream. The college is one of the provincial colleges of the Government of Assam and affiliated to Assam University, Silchar (a Central University of GOI). The subjects offered in the college are Assamese (MIL), Bengali (MIL, Elective & Honours), English (General, Alternative, Elective & Honors), History (Pass & Honours), Economics (Pass & Honours), Education (Pass & Honours), Political Science (Pass & Honours) and Sociology (Pass & Honours). There is also a study centre of Krishna Kanta Handique State Open University in the college which offers a Bachelors' Preparatory Programme, BA (Both Pass & Honours) and an MA in Sociology. A good number of learners are admitted to different courses at this study centre.

All schools of Maibang are run either by the state government or by private organizations. English is the primary languages of instruction in most of the schools. However, the newly established private schools are opting for English medium. The schools are recognized to Board of Secondary Education, Assam (SEBA) and Assam Higher Secondary Education Council (AHSEC). Some of the schools in and around Maibang are:
 Ever Green High School
 Maibang Higher Secondary School
 Pranabananda Vidya Mandir High School
 Maibang High School
 Wadrengdisa High School
 Dautohaja High School
 St. Xavier School
 Kalachand High School
 Jnaring Hindu Academy
 Sainja Valley School
 Maibang Govt. M. E. School
and some L. P. Schools

Transport
Broad gauge railway connections are:

Metre gauge railway connections that stopped in November 2014:

References

Cities and towns in Dima Hasao district
Dima Hasao district